D. Stuart Briscoe (9 November 1930 – 3 August 2022) was an evangelical Christian author, international speaker and senior pastor of Elmbrook Church, in Brookfield, Wisconsin, United States. Elmbrook is the largest church in Wisconsin, averaging 7,000 in attendance per week, making it one of the 100-largest churches in the United States. Briscoe is credited with transforming Elmbrook from a church of 300 members to one of the largest churches in America.

Briscoe was born in Millom, Cumbria, England, and had a career in banking followed by an international ministry under the auspices of Capernwray Missionary Fellowship of Torchbearers. In the 1960s, he became a popular conference speaker in the U.S., ministering to youth. Briscoe became senior pastor of Elmbrook Church in 1970. During his pastorate, Elmbrook grew enough to plant a number of "daughter" churches in the Greater Milwaukee area, while Briscoe also continued his international teaching ministry. He has written more than 80 books. His media ministry, Telling the Truth, which he founded in 1971, continues to broadcast online as well as on SiriusXM.

In 2000, after serving for 30 years as Elmbrook's senior pastor, Briscoe and his wife, Jill, embarked on new ministries as Elmbrook's Ministers-at-Large, concentrating on reaching out to pastors, missionaries and church leaders around the world, while still maintaining close ties with Elmbrook, their home church. Briscoe and his wife had three adult children and 13 grandchildren and the couple resided in Oconomowoc, Wisconsin.

References

External links
 Stuart & Jill Briscoe's Ministry website, Briscoe Ministries, Inc.
 Telling The Truth Ministries website
 Elmbrook Church website

1930 births
2022 deaths
American evangelicals
Religious leaders from Wisconsin
English emigrants to the United States
People from Millom
People from Oconomowoc, Wisconsin